Joseph Callaghan is a former association football goalkeeper who represented New Zealand at international level.

Callaghan played two official A-international matches for the New Zealand in 1960, both against Pacific minnows Tahiti, the first a 5–1 win on 5 September, the second a 2–1 win on 12 September 1960.

References 

Year of birth missing (living people)
Living people
New Zealand association footballers
New Zealand international footballers
Association football goalkeepers